Balakirev may refer to:
 Mily Balakirev, a Russian pianist, conductor and composer
 Balakirev the Buffoon, a 2002 Russian television adaptation of Lenkom play